KFUT may refer to:

 KHCV (FM), a radio station (104.3 FM) licensed to serve Mecca, California, United States, which held the call sign KFUT from 2014 to 2016
 KGAY (AM), a radio station (1270 AM) licensed to serve Thousand Palms, California, which held the call sign KFUT from 2007 to 2013